Casper Uka,  MBE  was an  Anglican bishop who served as Assistant Bishop of Melanesia from 1974 to 1980.

Uka was educated at St Peter's College, Siota. He was ordained deacon in 1962 and priest in 1964. He was consecrated Assistant Bishop of Melanesia at the Cathedral Church of St Barnabas, Honiara by John Chisholm, Archbishop of Melanesia on 8 November 1975.

References

Alumni of St Peter's College, Siota
Anglican assistant bishops of Melanesia
20th-century Anglican bishops in Oceania
Members of the Order of the British Empire